11948 Justinehénin, provisional designation , is a Themistian asteroid from the outer region of the asteroid belt, approximately 12 kilometers in diameter.

The asteroid was discovered on 18 August 1993, by Belgian astronomer Eric Elst at CERGA in Caussols, southeastern France. It was named for tennis player Justine Henin.

Orbit and classification 

Justinehénin orbits the Sun in the outer main-belt at a distance of 2.8–3.6 AU once every 5 years and 9 months (2,091 days). Its orbit has an eccentricity of 0.12 and an inclination of 2° with respect to the ecliptic. The first identification was made at Crimea–Nauchnij in 1973, extending the asteroid's observation arc by 31 years prior to its discovery.

Physical characteristics

Diameter and albedo 

Based on an absolute magnitude of 13.2, Justinehénin potentially measures between 6 and 14 kilometers in diameter, assuming an albedo in the range of 0.05 to 0.25. Since asteroids in the outer main-belt are mostly of a carbonaceous rather than of a silicaceous composition, with low albedos, typically around 0.06, Justinehénins diameter might be on the upper end of NASA's published conversion table, as the lower the body's reflectivity (albedo), the larger its diameter at a constant absolute magnitude (brightness).

Lightcurves 

As of 2017, the asteroid's effective size, its composition and albedo, as well as its rotation period and shape remain unknown.

Naming 

This minor planet was named for Belgian former professional tennis player Justine Henin (born 1985). Although her name (usually) contains no acute accent, the asteroid's official name does. The official naming citation was published by the Minor Planet Center on 10 September 2003.

References

External links 
 Asteroid Lightcurve Database (LCDB), query form (info )
 Dictionary of Minor Planet Names, Google books
 Asteroids and comets rotation curves, CdR – Observatoire de Genève, Raoul Behrend
 Discovery Circumstances: Numbered Minor Planets (10001)-(15000) – Minor Planet Center
 
 

 

011948
Discoveries by Eric Walter Elst
Named minor planets
19930818